Lyria (Microlyria) is a subgenus of sea snail, a marine gastropod mollusk in the family Volutidae.

References

External links
 Worms Link

Volutidae
Gastropod subgenera